Brucella pecoris is a gram-negative, oxidase-positive, non-spore-forming, rod-shaped non-motile bacteria from the genus of Brucella which was isolated from genitourinary lymph node of a sheep in Bosnia and Herzegovina.

References

External links
Type strain of Ochrobactrum pecoris at BacDive -  the Bacterial Diversity Metadatabase

Hyphomicrobiales
Bacteria described in 2011